The French Open, known originally as the Internationaux de France, is an annual tennis tournament created in 1891 and played on outdoor red clay courts at the Stade Roland Garros in Paris, France. The women's singles event began in 1897.

History
The French Open is played during two weeks in late May and early June, and has been chronologically the second of the four Grand Slam tournaments of the tennis season since 1987. The event was not held from 1915 to 1919 because of World War I, and after a one-year lapse in 1940, was unofficially held from 1941 to 1945 because of World War II.  The national body that organizes this event is the French Tennis Federation (FFT).

The Racing Club de France and the Stade Français of Paris alternated hosting the event before the competition was moved in 1928 to the newly built Stade Roland Garros, where it has been played since. The tournament was reserved for members of French tennis clubs until the first edition open to international players took place in 1925. From 1941 to 1944, the tournament took place under Vichy regime, won two times by Alice Weiwers and once by Simone Iribarne Lafargue, and Raymonde Jones Veber. Those editions are not counted by the FFT in the tournament's history, and were retroactively named Tournoi de France. In 1945, under the Provisional Government of the French Republic, the champion was Lolette Payot. Even if it was organised by the French Lawn Tennis Federation, the 1945 event is also not counted by the FFT in the tournament's history.

The women's singles rules have undergone several changes since the first edition. The event has always been contested in a knockout format. Records show that matches have always been played as the best-of-three sets format. The lingering death best-of-twelve points tie-break was introduced in 1973 for the first two sets.

The champion receives a miniature replica of the Coupe Suzanne Lenglen (Suzanne Lenglen Cup), named after Suzanne Lenglen. In 2010, the winner received prize money of €1,120,000.

In the French National Championship, which was when the tournament was reserved to members of French tennis clubs and French nationals, Adine Masson (1897–1899, 1902–1903) holds the record for most titles in women's singles with five victories. The record for most consecutive titles is four by Jeanne Matthey (1909–1912) and Lenglen (1920–1923), all of whose titles came during the club-members-only era.

In the French International Championships, that came after the tournament opened to international competitors but before the open era, Helen Wills Moody (1928–1930, 1932) holds the record for most titles at four. The record for most consecutive titles during this period is three by Wills Moody (1928–1930) and Hilde Krahwinkel Sperling (1935–1937).

During the French Open, since the inclusion of the professional tennis players, the record for most titles is held by Chris Evert with seven (1974–1975, 1979–1980, 1983, 1985–1986). The record for most consecutive titles during the Open Era is three by Monica Seles (1990–1992) and Justine Henin (2005–2007).

This event has been won without losing a set in the Open Era by Evonne Goolagong in 1971, Billie Jean King in 1972, Evert in 1974, Steffi Graf in 1988, Arantxa Sánchez Vicario in 1994, Henin in 2006 and 2007, and Iga Świątek in 2020.

Champions

French Championships

French Open

Statistics

Multiple champions

Champions by country

Notes

See also

French Open other competitions
List of French Open men's singles champions
List of French Open men's doubles champions 
List of French Open women's doubles champions
List of French Open mixed doubles champions

Grand Slam women's singles
List of Australian Open women's singles champions
List of Wimbledon ladies' singles champions
List of US Open women's singles champions
List of Grand Slam women's singles champions

References
General

Specific

External links
Internationaux de France de Roland-Garros – French Open official website

women
French Open women's singles champions
French Open